Dairut is a city in Egypt. It is located on the west bank of the Nile, in the Asyut Governorate. This is the point where the Nile divides, and a branch wanders off and eventually ends up in the Faiyum.

Climate 
Köppen-Geiger climate classification system classifies its climate as hot desert (BWh).

Notable people
Hafez Ibrahim
Mohamed Mustagab

References 

Populated places in Asyut Governorate